SpARCS1049+56 is a galaxy cluster whose heart is bursting with new stars and located at a distance of about 9.8 billion light-years away from Earth. It was discovered by NASA's Hubble and Spitzer space telescopes on 2015.

References

External links
 AstronomyNow

Galaxy clusters
Ursa Major (constellation)